Alexander Mavrocordatos (163623 December 1709) was a member of the Greek Mavrocordatos family, a doctor of philosophy and medicine of the University of Bologna, and Dragoman of the Porte to Sultan Mehmed IV in 1673 — notably employed in negotiations with the Habsburg monarchy during the Great Turkish War.

He was the son of Nikolaos Mavrocordatos and Loxandra Scarlatou.

Mavrocordatos drafted the Treaty of Karlowitz (1699). He became a secretary of state and was created a Reichsgraf of the Holy Roman Empire. His authority, with that of Amcazade Köprülü Hüseyin Pasha and Rami Mehmed Pasha, was supreme at the court of Mustafa II, and he did much to ameliorate the condition of Christians in the Ottoman Empire. He was disgraced in 1703, but was later recalled to court by Sultan Ahmed III.

He also wrote several historical, grammatical, and other treatises. In 1689, Alexander Mavrocordatus became a member of the German Academy of Sciences Leopoldina. His son, Nicholas Mavrocordatos, succeeded him as Dragoman in 1697 and in Nov 1709 was appointed hospodar of Moldavia.

References

Sources
  pp. 240–242

External links
 

1636 births
Politicians from Istanbul
1709 deaths
Alexander
Counts of the Holy Roman Empire
University of Bologna alumni
Dragomans of the Porte
Ottoman people of the Great Turkish War
Members of the German Academy of Sciences Leopoldina
17th-century translators
17th-century Greek politicians 
17th-century Greek writers
17th-century Greek educators
17th-century Greek scientists
17th-century Greek physicians
18th-century Greek politicians 
18th-century Greek writers
18th-century Greek educators
18th-century Greek scientists
18th-century Greek physicians
Constantinopolitan Greeks
Diplomats from Istanbul
Physicians from Istanbul